Imran Khan (born 1952) is a Pakistani former cricketer and politician who served as the 22nd prime minister of Pakistan.

Imran Khan or Imraan Khan may also refer to:

Cricketers
 Imraan Khan (born 1984), South African Test cricketer
 Imraan Khan (cricketer, born January 1984), South African cricketer for North West
 Imran Khan (cricketer, born 1963), Pakistani cricketer for Quetta
 Imran Khan (cricketer, born September 1973), Pakistani cricketer for Agriculture Development Bank of Pakistan
 Imran Khan (cricketer, born 1975), Pakistani cricketer for Karachi Blues, Karachi Whites, Public Works Department, and Hyderabad
 Imran Khan (cricketer, born 1987), Pakistani Test cricketer
 Imran Khan (cricketer, born 1988), Pakistani cricketer for Peshawar Panthers
 Imran Khan (Afghan cricketer) (born 2001)
 Imran Khan (Guyanese cricketer) (born 1982)
 Imran Khan (Indian cricketer) (born 1973)
 Imran Khan (Sri Lankan cricketer) (born 1992)
 Imran Khan (Trinidad and Tobago cricketer) (born 1984)

Other sports people
 Imran Hassan Khan (born 1983), Indian sport shooter
 Imran Khan (footballer), Indian football midfielder
 Imran Khan (kickboxer), British Muay Thai kickboxer

Entertainers
 Imran Khan (film actor) (born 1983), Bollywood actor
 Imran Khan (singer) (born 1984), Dutch singer of Pakistani descent
 Imran Khan, Indian actor in I Luv My India
 Imran "Hanzi" Khan, Howard Stern Show Wack Packer
 Imran Khan (TV actor), Indian actor, director, writer and producer

Others
 Imran Ahmad Khan (born 1973), former British MP
 Imran Ahsan Khan Nyazee (born 1945), Pakistani legal scholar
 Imran Khan (web developer) (born 1978), Indian web developer; mentioned in a speech by Indian Prime Minister Narendra Modi
 Imran Khand (1964–2016), British businessman, co-founder and CEO of Picsel
 Imran Khan (lawyer) (born 1964), lawyer who acted for Stephen Lawrence's family
 Imran Khan (businessman) (born 1977), chief strategy officer of Snap Inc., technology executive, entrepreneur and investor
 Imran Riaz Khan (born 1975), Pakistani journalist
 Imran Ullah Khan (born 1932), retired Pakistani Army general

Pakistani masculine given names